The 1985 World Mountain Running Championships was the 1st edition of the global mountain running competition, World Mountain Running Championships, organised by the World Mountain Running Association and was held in San Vigilio di Marebbe, Italy on 23 September 1985.

Results

Men individual
Distance 14.6 km, difference in height 1082 m, participants 38.

Team men

Men short distance

Men short distance team

Men junior individual

Men junior team

Women individual

Women team

References

External links
 World Mountain Running Association official web site

World Mountain Running Championships
World Long Distance Mountain Running